The Dr. F.W. Buercklin House is a historic house at 104 Main Street in Portia, Arkansas.  It is an L-shaped single-story Plain-Traditional frame and log structure whose initial construction is estimated to be 1880.  It is believed to be the oldest standing structure in the community and has served variously as a doctor's office, residence, and general store.  Its oldest portion is thought to be a four-pen log dogtrot, which has since been augmented by a fifth pen and frame additions.  It was home to the Buercklin family for most of the 20th century and is a rare survivor of a 1906 fire that destroyed many buildings in Portia.

The house was listed on the National Register of Historic Places in 1998.

See also
National Register of Historic Places listings in Lawrence County, Arkansas

References

Houses on the National Register of Historic Places in Arkansas
Houses completed in 1880
Houses in Lawrence County, Arkansas
National Register of Historic Places in Lawrence County, Arkansas